Anderson is the given name of:

People

Footballers
 Anderson Cléber Beraldo (born 1980), known as Anderson, defender, started at Corinthians
 Anderson Luiz de Carvalho (born 1981), known as Nenê, midfielder, started at Bahía
 Anderson Conrado (born 1978), known as Amaral, defender, started at Grêmio
 Anderson Costa (born 1984), known as Anderson, forward, started at Vasco
 Anderson Francisco da Cunha (born 1986), known as Anderson, defender, started at Portuguesa Santista
 Anderson Luiz Domingos (born 1988), known as Anderson, defender, started at Osasco-SP
 Anderson Silva de França (born 1982), known as Anderson de Silva or Anderson, midfielder, started at Nacional
 Anderson Simas Luciano (born 1976),  known as Tcheco, attacking midfielder, started at Paraná
 Anderson Luís (footballer, born 1987), started at Fluminense
 Anderson Martins (born 1987), started at Vitória
 Anderson (footballer, born 1988), midfielder, former Manchester United player
 Anderson Rodney de Oliveira (born 1980), known as Babù, striker, started at Salernitana
 Anderson José Lopes de Souza (born 1993), known as Anderson Lopes, striker, plays for FC Seoul
 Anderson Soares de Oliveira (born 1988), known as Anderson Bamba, defender for Eintracht Frankfurt
 Ânderson Polga (born 1979), defender, started at Grêmio
 Anderson Ribeiro (born 1981), striker, started at FC Arsenal Kharkiv
 Anderson Luiz Gomes Ribeiro (born 1982), known as Anderson Luiz, defender started at Flamengo
 Anderson Ricardo dos Santos (born 1983), known as Anderson, striker
 Anderson Luis de Souza (born 1977), known as Deco, midfielder, started at Nacional
 Anderson Conceição Xavier (born 1980), known as Xavier, defensive midfielder, started at Vitória
 Anderson (footballer, born 1998), goalkeeper, plays for Santa Cruz on loan from Palmeiras

Other
 Anderson Cooper (born 1967), American television personality, son of Gloria Vanderbilt
 Anderson Dawson (1863–1910), Australian politician
 Anderson Hernández (born 1982), Dominican former Major League Baseball player, currently playing in the Mexican League
 Anderson Rodrigues (volleyball) (born 1974), Brazilian volleyball player
 Anderson Silva (born 1975), Brazilian mixed martial artist, former UFC Middleweight Champion.
 Anderson Varejão (born 1982), Brazilian National Basketball Association player

See also
 Anderson (surname)

English masculine given names